Mono Town is an Icelandic musical band from Reykjavík with alternative pop and ambient influences formed in 2012 by brothers Börkur and Daði Birgisson (earlier from the Icelandic funk band Jagúar) and singer/guitarist Bjarki Sigurðsson on lead vocals.

Their debut album of 11 tracks in English language was In The Eye Of The Storm. It was recorded in Iceland, mixed by the Grammy Award winning mixer, Michael Brauer and has been a big success in Iceland upon release on 27 January 2014 by Key Music Management. A limited vinyl edition was also released. The initial single release "Peacemaker" has also charted in Iceland. In 2013, Deezer had announced that it was sponsoring the Icelandic band for an international launch. Mono Town performed at the inaugural All Tomorrow's Parties in Iceland and gained further international attention through being featured on the influential avant-garde American radio station KEXP. 

Their sophomore album of 9 tracks was released on September 28th, 2021 onto streaming services with no prior announcement.

Members
Bjarki Sigurðsson - guitar, lead vocals 
Börkur Birgisson - bass, multi-instrumentalist
Daði Birgisson - keyboards, multi-instrumentalist

Discography

Albums
2014: In the Eye of the Storm 
2021: Time, Vol. 1

Singles
2013: "Jackie O" 
2013: "Peacemaker"
2014: "Yesterday's Feeling"

References

External links
Official website
Facebook

Icelandic indie pop groups
Musical groups from Reykjavík